(born 24 April 1977 in the Ibaraki Prefecture) is a Japanese former rugby union player who played as scrum-half, he later became a coach, currently coaching NEC Green Rockets.

Career
He started to take up rugby in 1990, when he played for his high school's team, which he led to the victories at the Kanto Junior High School Tournament and the East Japan Junior High School Tournament two years later.   In 1995, he ended runner-up at the East Japan High School Selection Tournament, the Kanto Tournament A block, the 7th National Athletic Meeting, and the national tournament where he took part. Tsuji graduated from the same high school in 1996. In high school, he not only was a rugby player in the club, but also a talented musician, and was selected as a conductor of grade chorus.
In 1996, he entered Waseda University's School of Human Sciences and joined its rugby club. He was the first choice scrum-half since 3 years. In 2000, he joined NEC and thus, to NEC Green Rockets, the company's rugby team.   A year later, he played in All East Japan Senior League games.   He also won the 2002 All-Japan Rugby Football Championship for NEC.   In 2003, he represented Japan at the 2003 Rugby World Cup, debuting against Scotland in Townsville. In 2008, he finished the season and retired.    A year later, he was appointed as a Waseda University coach while still in duty for NEC.  In 2010, he became the director of Waseda University RFC. In 2012, Tsuji retired from Waseda University RFC director, succeeded by Yoshikazu Goto.

References

External links
Takashi Tsuji profile at Waseda University RFC
2019 ALL FOR JAPAN TEAM
Takashi Tsuji international stats

1977 births
Waseda University alumni
Japanese rugby union players
Japanese rugby union coaches
Sportspeople from Ibaraki Prefecture
Green Rockets Tokatsu players
Japan international rugby union players
Rugby union scrum-halves
Living people